The orientative case (abbreviated ) is a grammatical case that transmits the sense of something oriented towards another. It can be found in the Chukchi and Manchu languages.

Grammatical cases